Anakelisia is a genus of true bugs belonging to the family Delphacidae.

The genus was first described by Wagner in 1963.

The species of this genus are found in Europe and Australia.

Species:
 Anakelisia fasciata (Kirschbaum, 1868)
 Anakelisia perspicillata (Boheman, 1845)

References

Delphacidae